The light board operator (commonly referred to as the "Light Op" or "Board Op") or moving light programmer, is the electrician who operates and/or programs the light board. Depending on the scale and type of production, the board op may be responsible for conventional or automated lighting fixtures, as well as practicals and, in some instances, controlling video as well.  

Sometimes, most commonly in small productions, the light board operator will also be the stage manager. Another variation in smaller productions has the responsibilities of light board operator and sound operator combined into one position. In the smallest productions, all three of these functions are done by one person. For productions where lighting and sound are operated by a single person, as well productions where sound needs to be exactly timed with lighting, it is not unusual to use MIDI Show Control (MSC), Open Sound Control (OSC), or Timecode (SMPTE Time Code) to synchronize the lighting, video, and audio consoles.

The light board operator could, in some cases, also be the lighting designer for a production.

Responsibilities

The light op has many responsibilities in theater, especially in small productions.  For small productions, the light op may also be the lighting designer and master electrician, and is therefore required to create a lighting plot, and perform a complete hang and focus in addition to their duties as board operator. In more professional environments, the light board operator is a highly specialized professional who is usually well versed in the intricacies of a wide variety of lighting instruments and control consoles, and able to easily program complex lighting cues involving multiple fixtures and other components. 

During the technical rehearsals, the light board operator usually programs the lighting console with the assistance of the lighting designer and stage manager. In situations where manual boards are being used, the light board operator will work with the lighting designer and the stage manager to practice the timing of the lighting changes.

During the performance, the light board operator is often on headset with the Deputy Stage Manager, and multiple other members of the running crew. Their responsibility lies primarily in advancing the cues under the direction of the deputy stage manager. It is important that light board operators be familiar with the light plot, as they may be called upon to make "on the fly" changes to accommodate unexpected circumstances that occur during the production.

See also
Dimmer - controls intensity of the lights
Electrician (theater)
Film crew
Light board
Lighting design
Sound board
Spotlight operator - a similar job
Stage lighting instrument - what the operator is controlling
Stagecraft
Television crew
Theatre

References

External links
wordpress.com, Production Team & Crew Glossary

Stage lighting
Stage crew
Filmmaking occupations
Television terminology
Theatrical occupations
Broadcasting occupations